Parrondo is a Spanish surname.

 Gil Parrondo (1921–2016), Spanish art director, set decorator and production designer
 J. M. R. Parrondo (born 1964), Spanish physicist
 Parrondo's paradox (also Parrondo's games) a paradox in game theory created by him
 Roberto García Parrondo (born 1980), Spanish team handball player